"Regret"  is a song recorded by American singer LeToya Luckett released as the third single taken from her second studio album Lady Love (2009) featuring American rapper Ludacris. The song was written by Durell Babbs, Christopher Bridges, Jerry "Texx" Franklin, LeToya Luckett, Kristina Stephens, J. Valentine and produced by Babbs. The song was released on November 11, 2009, through Capital Records. The Sky High Remix was released on iTunes on December 18, 2009.

Although a music video was not initially released to promote the single, it quickly moved up the Billboard's Hot R&B/Hip-Hop Songs chart peaking at #8, becoming her fourth top twenty hit on that chart. It peaked at #78 on the Billboard's Hot 100 chart, (her second chart entry on the Hot 100). The song became her second most successful single of her solo career, behind her debut single "Torn". A remix with new lyrics and production, and a feature from rapper Missy Elliott leaked to the internet on November 18, 2009.

Controversy
The seemingly lack of support from Capitol Records for the "Lady Love" album caused a rift between the label and LeToya's fans, and it came to a head when it was revealed the label had no intentions to release a video for the single, despite its growing success on the Billboard charts off airplay alone. The fans fired back with an online petition stating, "We, the fans and supporters of LeToya Luckett are EXTREMELY disappointed at the way the entire "Lady Love" project has been handled thus far", and continued to say "...the third single, "Regret" featuring Ludacris, has already shown it has the potential to become her next smash hit single. LeToya's fans and supporters have already pushed the song into an enviable top 20 position, but we need your full support. Ultimately, a video was granted for the single, however it was released after it had peaked on the Billboard charts.

Music video
The "Regret" music video premiered on BET's 106 & Park on November 11, 2009. It was shot in Los Angeles, California, directed by Parris (The Dream, Ludacris, Swizz Beatz), and featured model Sean Newman who previously played her boyfriend in her “She Ain’t Got…” video. The video was ranked at number 23 on BET: Notarized: Top 100 Videos of 2009 countdown.

Chart performance
On October 3, 2009, the song peaked at number thirty-four on the US Adult R&B Songs chart. On November 14, 2009 the song peaked at number seventy-eight on the US Billboard Hot 100 chart, number eight on the US Hot R&B/Hip-Hop Songs and US Hot R&B/Hip-Hop Airplay chart and number forty-two on the US Radio Songs chart.

Track listing and formats

Charts

Weekly charts

Year-end charts

Release history

References

2009 songs
2009 singles
LeToya Luckett songs
Ludacris songs
Capitol Records singles